An irori is a traditional Japanese sunken hearth fired with charcoal. Used for heating the home and for cooking food, it is essentially a square, stone-lined pit in the floor, equipped with an adjustable pothook – called a jizaikagi and generally consisting of an iron rod within a bamboo tube – used for raising or lowering a suspended pot or kettle by means of an attached lever which is often decoratively designed in the shape of a fish. Historically irori served as the main source of residential heating and lighting, providing a place to cook, dry clothing, and serve as a communal gathering location.

Gallery

Footnotes

References

 

Fireplaces
Japanese home